The 1994 Los Angeles Raiders season was the franchise's 35th season overall, and the franchise's 25th season in the National Football League. They failed to improve on their 10–6 record from 1993 and missed the playoffs for the second time in three years. The Raiders would return to their original home in Oakland the following season.

Offseason

NFL draft

Staff

Roster

Regular season

Schedule

Standings

Season summary

Week 3

Week 10

Starting QBs=Jeff Hostetler - Los Angeles Raiders vs Joe Montana - Kansas City Chiefs

Week 11

The final meeting between the two teams with both franchises in Los Angeles.

References

External links
 1994 Los Angeles Raiders at Pro-Football-Reference.com

Los Angeles Raiders
1994
Los